The following is a list of conventional lines of rail transport in China. For the high-speed network, see List of high-speed railway lines in China.

North–south direction

Beijing-Harbin Corridor 
Jingqin Railway; Beijing-Qinhuangdao 京秦线
Jingshan Railway; Beijing-Shanhaiguan 京山线
Shenshan Railway; Shenyang-Shanhaiguan 沈山线
Qinshen Passenger Railway; Qinhuangdao-Shenyang 秦沈客运专线
Changda Railway; Changchun-Dalian 长大线
Changbin Railway; Changchun-Harbin 长滨线
Binzhou Railway; Harbin-Manzhouli 滨洲线

In passenger rail service, Jingshan Railway, Shenshan Railway, Changda Railway|Changda Railway, Changchun-Shenyang Portion and Changbin Railway are collectively called Jingha Railway (Beijing-Harbin).

East Coast
Changda Railway; Changchun-Dalian 长大线, Shenyang-Dalian Portion (沈大段)
Yanda Railway Ferry 烟大铁路轮渡
Lanyan Railway; Lancun-Yantai 蓝烟线
Jiaoxin Railway; Jiaozhou-Xinyi 胶新线
Xinyi–Changxing railway; Xinyi-Changxing 新长线
Xuancheng–Hangzhou railway Xuancheng-Hangzhou宣杭线, Hangzhou-Changxing Portion (杭长段)
Xiaoshan–Ningbo railway; Xiaoshan-Ningbo 萧甬线
 Ningbo-Taizhou-Wenzhou Railway Ningbo-Wenzhou 甬台温铁路
 Wenzhou–Fuzhou railway Wenzhou-Fuzhou 温福铁路
 Fuzhou–Xiamen railway Fuzhou-Xiamen 福厦铁路
Yingtan–Xiamen railway; Yingtan-Xiamen 鹰厦线, Zhangping-Xiamen Portion (漳厦段)

Beijing-Shanghai Corridor 
Jingshan Railway; Beijing-Shanhaiguan 京山线, Beijing-Tianjin Portion (京津段)
Jingpu Railway; Tianjin-Pukou 津浦线
Huning Railway; Shanghai-Nanjing 沪宁线

Jingshan Railway Beijing-tianjin Portion, Jingpu Railway and Huning Railway are collectively called Jinghu Railway(京沪线) in passenger rail service.

Beijing-Kowloon Corridor 
Jingjiu Railway 京九线 / 京九鐵路; Beijing-Shenzhen (and onward into Kowloon, Hong Kong)
Guangshen Railway; Guangzhou-Shenzhen 广深铁路

Jingjiu Railway uses the same line as Guangmeishan Railway between Longchuan and Dongguan. It also uses the same line as Guangshen Railway between Dongguan and Shenzhen. It then crosses the border and follows the East Rail line to Kowloon, Hong Kong.

Beijing-Guangzhou Corridor 
Jingguang Railway; Beijing-Guangzhou 京广线

Datong-Zhanjiang Corridor 
Beitongpu Railway; Datong-Fenglingdu 北同蒲线
Taijiao Railway; Taiyuan-Jiaozuo 太焦线
Jiaoliu Railway; Jiaozuo-Liuzhou 焦柳线
Shichang Railway; Shimenxian-Changsha 石长线
Xianggui Railway; Hengyang-Pingxiang 湘桂线
Yuehai Railway; Guangdong-Haikou粤海铁路

Baotou-Liuzhou Corridor
Shenmu–Yan'an railway神延铁路
Xi'an–Yan'an railway 西延铁路
Xi'an–Ankang railway 西康铁路

Baoji-Kunming Corridor 
Baocheng Railway; Baoji-Chengdu 宝成铁路
Chengdu–Kunming Railway; Chengdu-Kunming 成昆铁路

East–west direction

Beijing-Lhasa 
Fengtai–Shacheng railway; Fengtai-Shacheng 丰沙铁路
Beijing–Baotou railway; Beijing-Baotou 京包铁路
Baotou–Lanzhou railway; Baotou-Lanzhou 包兰铁路
Lanzhou–Qinghai railway; Lanzhou-Xining 兰青铁路
Qinghai–Tibet railway; Xining-Lhasa 青藏铁路

Eurasian Land Bridge 
Longhai Railway; Lianyungang-Lanzhou 陇海铁路
Lanzhou–Xinjiang railway; Lanzhou-Xinjiang 兰新铁路
Northern Xinjiang Railway;Ürümqi-Alashankou (Alataw Pass)北疆铁路
 The Second Ürümqi-Jinghe Railway (乌精二线)
Nanjing–Xi'an railway; Nanjing-Xi'an 宁西铁路

Yangtze River Valley 
Nanjing–Qidong railway 宁启铁路
Nanjing–Tongling railway 宁铜铁路 (including Nanjing-Wuhu Railway 宁芜铁路)
Tongling–Jiujiang railway 铜九铁路
Wuhan–Jiujiang railway 武九铁路
Wuhan-Yichang Railway 汉宜铁路
Yichang–Wanzhou railway 宜万铁路

Shanghai-Kunming Railway (Hukun Line) 
Shanghai–Hangzhou railway; Shanghai-Hangzhou 沪杭铁路
Zhegan Railway; Hangzhou-Zhuzhou 浙赣铁路
Xiangqian Railway; Zhuzhou-Guiyang 湘黔铁路
Shanghai–Kunming railway; Guiyang-Kunming 贵昆铁路

South Coast 
 Xiamen–Shenzhen railway Xiamen–Shenzhen 厦深铁路
Guangzhou–Meizhou–Shantou railway; Guangzhou–Meizhou–Shantou 广梅汕线 
Guangzhou–Sanshui railway; Guangzhou–Sanshui 广三线
Guangzhou–Maoming railway; Sanshui–Longhua 三茂线
Hechun–Maoming railway; Hechun–Maoming 河茂线
Litang–Zhanjiang railway; Litang–Zhanjiang 黎湛线
Hainan eastern ring high-speed railway
Yuehai railway; Zhanjiang–Haikou 粤海铁路
Guangdong–Hainan railway, Guangzhou–Haikou  (includes the Guangdong–Hainan Ferry)

Other inter-regional railways
Xinjiang–Tibet railway (proposed)
Huanghua–Dajiawa railway 黄大铁路 (freight only)

Regional railways

North
Beijing–Zhangjiakou railway; Beijing–Zhangjiakou 京张线
Beijing–Chengde railway; Beijing–Chengde 京承线
Chengde–Longhua railway; Chengde–Longhua 承隆线
Yeboshou–Chifeng railway; Yeboshou–Chifeng 叶赤线
Ningwu–Kelan railway 宁岢铁路
Handan–Changzhi railway 邯长铁路
Handan–Jinan railway 邯济铁路
Xinxiang–Yanzhou railway 新兖铁路
Yanzhou–Shijiusuo railway 兖石铁路
Zibo–Dongying railway 淄东铁路
Dongdu–Pingyi railway 东平铁路
Ciyao–Laiwu railway 磁莱铁路
Xindian–Taian railway 辛泰铁路
Yangpingguan–Ankang railway 阳安铁路
Yangquan–Dazhai railway 阳大铁路
Tianjin–Jizhou railway 津蓟铁路
Tangshan–Caofeidian railway
Jiexiu–Yangquanqu railway

Northeast
Beijing–Tongliao railway; Beijing–Tongliao 京通铁路
Jinzhou–Chengde railway; Jinzhou–Chengde 锦承线
Weizhangzi–Tashan railway; Weizhangzi–Tashan 魏塔线
Jining–Tongliao railway; Jining–Tongliao 集通线
Jinzhou–Nanpiao railway; Jinzhou–Nanpiao 南票线
Xinlitun–Yixian railway; Xinlitun–Yixian 新义线
Gaotaishan–Xinlitun railway; Gaotaishan–Xinlitun 高新线
Goubangzi–Tangwangshan railway;Goubangzi–Tangwangshan 沟海线
Yingkou–Dashiqiao railway; Yingkou–Dashiqiao 营口线
Zhoushuizi–Lushun railway; Zhoushuizi–Lushun旅顺线
Jinzhou–Chengzidan railway; Jinzhou–Chengzidan 金城线
Chengzidan–Zhuanghe railway; Chengzidan–Zhuanghe 城庄线
Qiqihar–Bei'an railway; Qiqihar–Bei'an 齐北铁路
Fuyu–Nenjiang railway; Fuyu–Nenjiang 富嫩铁路
Nenjiang–Greater Khingan Forest railway; Nenjiang–Greater Khingan Forest District 嫩林铁路
Tongliao–Ranghulu railway; Tongliao–Daqing 通让铁路
Baiyinhua–Xinqiu railway 巴新铁路 (freight only)
Xiangyangchuan–Hayudao railway 向阳川－哈鱼岛铁路

East and Southeast
 Anhui–Jiangxi railway Wuhu–Guixi 皖赣铁路
 Hengfeng–Nanping railway Hengfeng–Nanping 横南铁路
 Nanping–Fuzhou railway Nanping (Waiyang Station)–Fuzhou 外福铁路
 Zhangping–Quanzhou–Xiaocuo railway Zhangping–Quanzhou 漳泉肖铁路
 Xiangtang–Putian railway Nanchang–Fuzhou, Putian 向莆铁路
 Zhangping–Longyan railway; Zhangping–Longyan 漳龙铁路
 Meikan railway; Meizhou–Kanshi 梅坎铁路
 Longyan–Xiamen railway Longyan–Xiamen 龙厦铁路
 Ganzhou–Longyan railway Ganzhou–Longyan 赣厦铁路
 Jinhua–Wenzhou railway Jinhua–Wenzhou 金温铁路
 Ganzhou–Shaoguan railway Ganzhou–Shaoguan 赣韶铁路
Quzhou–Ningde railway
Dezhou–Dajiawa railway Dezhou–Weifang 德大铁路 (freight only east of Dongying)
Dongying Port railway 东营港疏港铁路 (freight only)
Longkou–Yantai railway
Xiangtangxi–Le'an railway (freight only, partially abandoned)
Xingguo–Quanzhou railway (under construction)
Binhai Port railway (under construction)
Jinhua–Taizhou railway (under construction)

South Central
 Jingmen–Shashi railway 荆沙铁路
 Hankou–Danjiangkou railway 汉丹铁路
Huaihua–Shaoyang–Hengyang railway 怀邵衡铁路
 Huizhou Port railway 惠州港铁路 (freight only)
 Nansha Port railway 南沙港铁路

Southwest
Xiangyang–Chongqing railway; Xiangyang–Chongqing 襄渝铁路
Dazhou–Chengdu railway 达成铁路; Chengdu–Dazhou
Chengdu–Chongqing (Chengyu) railway; Chengdu–Chongqing 成渝铁路
Suining–Chongqing railway; 遂渝铁路
Yuli railway; Chongqing–Lichuan 渝利铁路
Chongqing–Huaihua railway; Chongqing–Huaihua 渝怀铁路
Sichuan–Guizhou railway; Chongqing–Guiyang 川黔铁路
Guizhou–Guangxi railway Guiyang–Liuzhou 黔桂铁路
Hunan–Guangxi railway Hengyang–Pingxiang 湘桂铁路
Nanning–Kunming railway; Nanning–Kunming 南昆铁路
Neijiang–Kunming railway; Neijiang–Kunming 内昆铁路
Yunnan–Vietnam railway; Kunming–Hanoi 昆河铁路
Guangtong–Dali railway; Guangtong Station–Dali 广大铁路
Dali–Lijiang railway; Dali–Lijiang 大丽铁路
Kunming–Yuxi railway; Kunming–Yuxi 昆玉铁路
Weishe–Hongguo railway; Weishe–Hongguo 威红铁路
Pan County West railway; Hongguo–Zhanyi 盘西铁路
Liupanshui–Baiguo railway; Liupanshui–Baiguo 水柏铁路
Yulin–Tieshangang railway; Yulin–Tieshangang 玉铁铁路
Wen'an–Machangping railway 瓮马铁路 (under construction)
Dali–Ruili railway 大瑞铁路 (under construction)

Northwest
Linhe–Ceke railway; Linhe–Ejin Banner 临策铁路
Jiayuguan–Ceke railway; Jiayuguan–Ejin Banner 嘉策铁路
Southern Xinjiang railway; Turpan–Kashgar 南疆铁路
Kashgar–Hotan railway; Kashgar–Hotan 喀和铁路
Jinghe–Yining–Khorgos railway; Jinghe–Yining–Khorgos 精伊霍铁路
Kuytun–Beitun railway; Kuytun–Beitun 奎北铁路
Ürümqi–Dzungaria railway; Ürümqi–Jiangjunmiao 乌准铁路
Hami–Lop Nur railway; Hami–Lop Nur 哈罗铁路
Hotan–Ruoqiang railway (under construction)
Tianshui–Longnan railway 天陇铁路 (under construction)

Coal transport railways
Datong–Qinhuangdao railway 大秦铁路
Ningwu–Jingle railway 宁静铁路
Shenhuang railway
Houma–Yueshan railway 侯月铁路
Xinxiang–Yueshan railway 新月铁路

Intra-city Metros 
 Urban rail transit in China
 Rail transport in Hong Kong

Former railways 
Woosung Road

International railways 
 China–Nepal railway
 China–Pakistan railway
 China–Laos railway
 China–North Korea railway
 Yiwu–London railway line
 Chongqing–Xinjiang–Europe Railway
 Yiwu–Madrid railway line
 Trans–Mongolian Railway

External links

 Individual China Rail Passenger routes displayed in Google Maps with timetable (Chinese and English)
Railway map of China (1). Showing double track lines, eletrified lines and planned lines in detail around year 2001.
Railway map of China (2). Showing railway network in 1990s.
Railway map of China (3). Showing railway network in 1980s.
Railway map of China (4). Showing railway network by 2006. 
Railway map of China (5). Very Large railway map of China in Both English and Chinese by 2006.

China
 
Lines